The Edmonton Indy was a round of the IndyCar Series held at a temporary circuit set up at the Edmonton City Centre Airport near the downtown area of Edmonton, Alberta, Canada. It was formerly called the Rexall Grand Prix of Edmonton and was a round of the Champ Car World Series. It was one of three Champ Car races added to the 2008 IndyCar Series following the merger of the two American open-wheel racing series.

History
The inaugural race was held in 2005 and was known as the West Edmonton Mall Grand Prix. It was known in 2006 as the West Edmonton Mall Grand Prix Presented by The Brick. In 2007, Katz Group signed with the Grand Prix of Edmonton as the race's lead sponsor. In 2010, Honda Canada Inc. was the title sponsor of the race. There was no title sponsor in 2011.

During the 2010 race weekend, it was announced that Octane Motorsports Events from Montreal, promoter of the Formula 1 Canadian Grand Prix and the NASCAR Nationwide race at Circuit Gilles Villeneuve, was taking over as the new promoter. In November, the City and the promoter not being able to reach an agreement concerning pavement work to be done on the Eastern runway of City Centre Airport, where the race course was to be moved, the event was cancelled. Further negotiations had the race returned on the 2011 IZOD IndyCar Series schedule for July 22–24. On February 8, 2011, the promoter unveiled the new racecourse (13-turn, 3.579 km) which received rave reviews from several IndyCar drivers.

On September 21, 2012, Octane Motorsports announced that they will not stage the 2013 race due to poor attendance and lack of support from local businesses. City officials have said that they do not plan to look for a replacement promoter.

Festivities

2005

The 2005 race festivities took place from July 15 through July 17, 2005.

2006

In 2006, there were 3 support series events. The Champ Car Atlantic Championship series, the CASCAR series, and D-Sport Drifting Demo. The 2006 race festivities took place from July 21 through July 23, 2006. The CASCAR race event took place on Saturday, July 22, 2006. The Champ Car Atlantic Championship race, the Champ Car World Series race, and the D-Sport Drifting Demo all took place on Sunday, July 23, 2006.

2007

The 2007 race festivities took place from July 20 through July 22, 2007. The Northern Alberta Sports Car Club held GT and Vintage class support races also.

2008

The 2008 race festivities took place July 24 through July 26, 2008. There were also 2 support series events, the Atlantic Championship series and the NASCAR Canadian Tire Series.
The IndyCar Series race took place on Saturday and not Sunday in 2008 because of an agreement between the IRL and the Indianapolis Motor Speedway.  By agreement, the IRL is not permitted to race opposite the NASCAR Sprint Cup Series Allstate 400 at the Brickyard at the Indianapolis Motor Speedway.

2009

Held on July 26, 2009 it was the eleventh round of the 2009 IndyCar Series season.

2010

The race festivities took place from July 23 through July 25, 2010. There were three support series at this event, the Indy Lights Series, NASCAR Canadian Tire Series and the Northern Alberta Sports Car Championship. In addition, there were also a demonstration provided by D-Sport Drifting.

This year also saw the creation of an off the track event team called Race Week Edmonton.  This all volunteer team's mandate was to assist in promoting the Honda Edmonton Indy with various events such as car shows, a go kit derby, autoslalom, and a large slate of music events.

2011

The race festivities took place from July 22 through July 24, 2011. However, steady rainfall saw the cancellation of all on-track events on July 22. This caused Indy Lights and IndyCar practice sessions to be moved to July 23. There were two support series at this event, the Indy Lights Series and the Northern Alberta Sports Car Championship. Unlike previous years, the Indy Lights Series ran two races with one on Saturday and one on Sunday, these were known as the Edmonton Twin 100s Race.

This event also saw the debut of a new course, moving from the western runways to the eastern runways of the City Centre Airport. This was caused by redevelopment of airport lands by the City of Edmonton. As well, Octane Motorsports took over the promoting of the race from Northlands declined to continue to run the race. This caused a temporary cancellation of the event in November, 2011. During this cancellation, the NASCAR Canadian Tire Series released their schedule and saw Edmonton not scheduled for the 2011 season.

2012

The 2012 Edmonton Indy race was the eleventh round of the 2012 IndyCar Series season. Indy Lights and the NASCAR Canadian Tire Series also took place. It took place on Sunday, July 22, 2012. Hélio Castroneves won in the IndyCar Series, Carlos Muñoz won in the Indy Lights series, and D. J. Kennington won in the NASCAR Canadian Tire Series.

The 2012 Edmonton Indy was the last in Edmonton. The city had spent over $12 million over the last three years and a total of $22 million over eight years. Beginning in 2008 the non-profit organization Northlands ran the Indy for three years, losing $12.5 million. There was also drop in attendance for the event over the last few years; the INDYCAR company forbids releasing attendances numbers. This also played a part in the decision to cancel.

Past winners

2008: Race shortened due to time limit.

Atlantic Championship

Firestone Indy Lights

NASCAR Canadian Tire Series

Lap Records
The fastest official race lap records at Edmonton Indy are listed as:

Attendance
In its inaugural year (2005), Edmonton set the attendance record for a Champ Car event in Canada at 200,052.

* Estimate

From 2008 onwards, event organizers have refused to disclose attendance figures due to an agreement with the Indy Racing League.

References

External links
Edmonton Indy official website
Edmonton street-circuit race results at Racing-Reference

 
Champ Car circuits
IndyCar Series tracks
NASCAR tracks
Recurring sporting events established in 2005
Former IndyCar Series races
NASCAR races
Recurring sporting events disestablished in 2012
Defunct sports competitions in Canada
2005 establishments in Alberta
2012 disestablishments in Alberta